Onychocellidae is a family of bryozoans belonging to the order Cheilostomatida.

Many different descendant species across the world resemble this extinct family. Some examples are N. clarkei and N. cribiforma which can be found in Australia, Floridina stellata and Onychocella ariyalurensis in Southern India, and Onychocella rowei and Onychocella mimosa in Belarus. While this family is extinct, it evolved to form new species that are all over the world and continue to resemble it.

Genera

Genera:
 Aechmella Canu & Bassler, 1917
 Aechmellina Taylor, Martha & Gordon, 2018
 Cheethamia Shaw, 1967

References

Cheilostomatida